Aloha High School is a suburban public high school in Aloha, Oregon, United States. It is part of the Beaverton School District.

History

In the 1950s, the Beaverton area had separate high school and elementary school districts. The high school district served Beaverton High School and Sunset High School. There were also twelve elementary school districts. In 1960, the thirteen districts were unified after a vote of the people.

The Beaverton area was one of the fastest growing in the state, and in 1962, the district determined that a new high school was needed. The former Kinnaman Dairy Farm was purchased, and in 1966, construction began on a new building. There were construction delays, so in September 1968, the first Aloha High School tenth and eleventh grade students used the former Merle Davies Elementary School and parts of Beaverton High School. The Aloha High School building, though incomplete, held its first classes in 1970.

School crest
The community of Aloha (pronounced Ah-LO-wa) was likely named for a place in the state of Wisconsin, and not for the Hawaiian word aloha. The association with Hawaii, however, gives the school its mascot, a Hawaiian warrior, and the design of the school crest, which includes a warrior and a conch shell, a symbol associated with Hawaii. The crest was designed by students during the 1968–69 and 1969–1970 school years.

Demographics
As of the 2012–13 school year, the school was 1% American Indian/Alaskan Native, 7% Asian, 4% Black, 1% Hawaiian Native/Pacific Islander, 32% Hispanic, 49% White, and 6% multiracial. Approximately 53% of students qualified for free or reduced lunch.

Athletics and activities
School activities sanctioned by the Oregon School Activities Association include football, volleyball, soccer, cross country, basketball, swimming, wrestling, dance/drill, cheerleading, baseball, softball, track and field, tennis, golf, band, choir, solo music, and speech.

State championships
 Football: 2011
 Boys' track and field: 1978, 2012
 Boys' golf: 1977
 Cheerleading 6A/5A Large division: 2013, 2014, 2016
 Girls' cross country: AAA, 1980, 1981, 1983

Notable alumni

 Wally Backman (Class of 1977), baseball player, member of Oregon Sports Hall of Fame
 Michael Crooke, businessperson and academic
 Brad Fitzpatrick (Class of 1998), founder of LiveJournal
 Jen-Hsun Huang (Class of 1981), co-founder and CEO of NVIDIA
 Brian Joelson, former tennis player
 Greg McMackin, former head football coach at Hawaii from 1968 to 1972
 Thomas Tyner, (Class of 2013), former football player at the University of Oregon
 Joe Wolfinger, basketball player

References

External links

 Aloha High School (official website)
 Aloha High School from The Oregonian "Your Schools" series

1968 establishments in Oregon
Beaverton School District
Educational institutions established in 1968
High schools in Washington County, Oregon
Public high schools in Oregon